Stade Gilbert Brutus is a rugby league stadium in Perpignan, France, which is the home ground of the Catalans Dragons.

History

In the 1970s and 1980s, the ground was used by both rugby league and rugby union clubs in Northern Catalonia. It was previously the home ground of rugby league club XIII Catalan. The stadium was named in honour of Gilbert Brutus, in memory of a French rugby union player, coach, chairman and referee, who was born on 2 August 1887 in Port-Vendres and, as a member of the Resistance, was murdered by the Gestapo on 7 March 1944 in Perpignan.

Expansion
Before 2007, the Stade Gilbert Brutus held 4,200, including 900 seats. This was deemed inadequate for the Catalans Dragons who played at the Stade Aimé Giral in 2006. Expansion of the stadium began in 2006 with the aim of increasing capacity to 14,000.

The first phase of construction included two covered, all-seater stands, one with hospitality suites. By the end of the 2006 season, the work was finished and Catalans moved back into the stadium for the 2007 season. Further construction in 2010 brought capacity up to 13,000, with three all-seater stands.

Rugby League Test matches
The Stade Gilbert Brutus has hosted twenty-five rugby league internationals. Twenty-four of them involved France.

 Match played as part of the 1975 World Cup.♦ Match played as part of the 1985-1988 World Cup.♦♦ Matches played as part of the 1989-1992 World Cup.† Match played as part of the 2013 World Cup.

On 29 October 1972, the Stade Gilbert Brutus hosted a 1972 World Cup match between Australia and Great Britain with an attendance of 6,324. Great Britain won 27 - 21

See also

List of rugby league stadiums by capacity

References

External links

Gilbert Brutus
Buildings and structures completed in 2007
Perpignan
Sport in Perpignan
Catalans Dragons
Sports venues in Pyrénées-Orientales
Rugby League World Cup stadiums
Sports venues completed in 1962
21st-century architecture in France